Romain Ruffier (born 4 October 1989) is a French professional footballer who plays as a goalkeeper for RFCU Luxembourg in the Luxembourg National Division. Racing FC was formed in 2005 from the merger of the capital's three big football clubs, namely Alliance 01 , Spora and Union.

References

External links
Profile at Soccerway
Profile at SO Foot

1989 births
Living people
Footballers from Nîmes
Association football goalkeepers
French footballers
French expatriate footballers
Amiens SC players
FC Metz players
Racing FC Union Luxembourg players
Ligue 2 players
Championnat National 3 players
Championnat National players
Luxembourg National Division players
Expatriate footballers in Luxembourg
French expatriate sportspeople in Luxembourg